Henry T. Blackaby is the founder of Blackaby Ministries International and an influential evangelical pastor. Most known for his best selling study called Experiencing God, he has also authored many other books and articles. Blackaby's lifetime of work has had a significant impact upon the religious life of many evangelicals in the United States and in Canada. His books have been translated into more than 40 languages and have had worldwide influence.

Background
Henry T. Blackaby was born in British Columbia. He studied English and History at the University of British Columbia as an undergraduate and earned his B.D. and Th.M. from Golden Gate Baptist Theological Seminary. He also holds four honorary doctorate degrees. In 1970, Blackaby began pastoring at a tiny church in Saskatoon, Canada. Blackaby went on to serve on the staff at the North American Mission Board of the Southern Baptist Convention and also served as special assistant to the presidents of the International Mission Board and LifeWay Christian Resources. Other accomplishments include serving as a music director; an education director; a pastor in California and Canada; and President of Canadian Baptist Theological College for seven years. He has notably published many spiritual books. One of his most popular publications was Experiencing God: Knowing and Doing the Will of God  in 1990, selling seven million copies. Blackaby also won the Gold Medallion Award for the devotionals, Experiencing God Together and Experiencing God Day by Day.

Education
 University of British Columbia – English & History
 Golden Gate Baptist Theological Seminary – Bachelor of Divinity & Master of Theology
 Four Honorary Doctorates have also been awarded

Books
 Experiencing God: Knowing and Doing the Will of God
 Experiencing God: Knowing and Doing the Will of God : Youth Edition
 Experiencing God: How to Live the Full Adventure of Knowing and Doing the Will of God
 Spiritual Leadership: Moving People on to God's Agenda
 Experiencing God Day-By-Day: The Devotional and Journal
 Hearing God's Voice
 The Man God Uses
 Experiencing the Spirit: The Power of Pentecost Every Day
 Experiencing Prayer with Jesus: The Power of His Presence and Example
 Called to Be God's Leader: Lessons from the Life of Joshua
 Holiness: God's Plan for Fullness of Life
 Created to Be God's Friend: How God Shapes Those He Loves
 What's So Spiritual about Your Gifts?
 Experiencing the Cross: Your Greatest Opportunity for Victory Over Sin
 Fresh Encounter: God's Plan for Your Spiritual Awakening
 Experiencing the Resurrection: The Everyday Encounter That Changes Your Life
 Experiencing God Day by Day
 Called & Accountable: God's Purpose for Every Believer
 Experiencing God; How to Live the Full Adventure of Knowing and Doing the Will of God
 On Mission with God: Living God's Purpose for His Glory
 The Ways of God: How God Reveals Himself Before a Watching World
 Chosen to Be God's Prophet: Samuel
 What the Spirit Is Saying to the Churches
 A God Centered Church: Experiencing God Together
 Discovering God's Daily Agenda
 Anointed to Be God's Servants: How God Blesses Those Who Serve Together
 Experiencing God Together: God's Plan to Touch Your World
 When God Speaks: How to Recognize God's Voice and Respond in Obedience

References

External link

Living people
20th-century evangelicals
21st-century evangelicals
Canadian evangelicals
Christian writers
Year of birth missing (living people)